The Baltimore Banner is a news website in Baltimore founded by the Venetoulis Institute for Local Journalism, which is a nonprofit set up by Stewart W. Bainum Jr. It launched June 14, 2022.

The  Baltimore Banner  was also a 1965 newspaper, set up as a "strike paper" during a strike against Baltimore newspapers. During a 1984 strike, strikers considered resurrecting it.

History

2022 paper
Bainum stated The Baltimore Banner takes its name from the Star-Spangled Banner flag that waved over Fort McHenry in 1814 during the War of 1812 and gave its name to the American national anthem.  Others have cited other inspiration.

After Alden Global Capital refused an offer from Bainum to buy The Baltimore Sun as part of their 2021 acquisition of Tribune Publishing, Bainum backed an all-digital, nonprofit competitor to be named The Baltimore Banner in 2022, owned by The Venetoulis Institute for Local Journalism. It launched with 42 journalists and plans to expand to 70 by the end of the year.   Bainum cited his experience from the Maryland State Legislature in the 1970s, when "he marveled at the reporters’ ability to sort the honest politicians from the 'political whores' by exposing abuses of power."  "Mr. Bainum’s goal... is to build the largest newsroom in Maryland — more than 100 journalists," reported the New York Times.

On October 27, 2021, The Venetoulis Institute announced the hiring of former Los Angeles Times managing editor Kimi Yoshino as The Banner'''s editor-in-chief.  The next day, The Institute announced the hiring of Klas Uden as Chief Marketing Officer, Shameel Arafin as Chief Product Officer, Early Cokley as Head of Technology, and Andre Jones as Head of People, Culture and Diversity. In December 2021, the Venetoulis Institute has hired former Wall Street Journal and Dow Jones executive Imtiaz Patel as chief executive officer.

The Banner has hired several current and former Sun reporters, including crime reporter Justin Fenton, education reporter Liz Bowie, enterprise reporter Tim Prudente, and statehouse reporter Pam Wood. The Banner has also set up a “Creatives in Residence” program to "feature the work of Baltimore-area artists and writers." At launch, this group included D. Watkins, Kondwani Fidel, Kerry Graham, and Mikea Hugley.

On May 14, 2022, the Banner announced a joint operating agreement with WYPR, an NPR affiliate. The outlets pledged to share content and work together to cover stories and develop joint programming.

1965 strike paper
While members of the American Newspaper Guild (union) went on strike against the Baltimore News-American, Baltimore Evening Sun, and Baltimore Sun, as the "Baltimore Banner Co." they published the Baltimore Banner "strike paper" daily from April 30 to May 28.

1984 strike consideration
Patrick Gilbert, chairman of the Baltimore Sun unit of the Washington-Baltimore Local 35 of the American Newspaper Guild, led some 700 members on strike.  The target was A.S. Abell Publishing, owners of the morning Baltimore Sun (circulation 185,510), Evening Sun (circulation 163,672), and Sunday Sun (circulation of 407,436), employing some 1,500 full-time and 700 part-time workers.  Guild members took steps to resume the Baltimore Banner strike paper.

2005 On the Forward Edge
In 2005, the Baltimore Banner featured in a chapter of a novelistic retelling of history called On the Forward Edge by Robert D. Loevy, professor emeritus at Colorado College.  The name here substitutes for a real-life newspaper (Baltimore News-Post), owned by the "Patriot Newspaper chain" (Hearst Corporation), competing with the Baltimore Beacon (Baltimore Sun).  The chapter focuses on a civil rights protest at a local restaurant chain, amidst which the protagonist realizes:  "it was the first time in history that photographs of African-Americans, except for wanted criminals, were printed in the Baltimore Banner''."

See also
 1962–1963 New York City newspaper strike
 List of newspapers in Maryland
Strike paper

References

External links
 The Baltimore Banner (Baltimore, Md.) 1965-1965 @ Library of Congress
 Baltimore Banner Collection (1965) @ Maryland State Archives
 The Venetoulis Institute For Local Journalism

Newspapers published in Baltimore
Newspaper labor disputes in the United States
Strike paper
Nonprofit newspapers
1965 establishments in Maryland